Peter Dahlsen (born 23 February 1951) is an Australian actor turned barrister. In that country, he was known for appearing in soap operas: as Richie Bates in Bellbird (including being in the 1000th episode) during the 1970s and as Bill Ashley in Sons and Daughters during the 1980s.

His acting work in both Australia and the United Kingdom consists of Matlock Police, Division 4, Homicide, Secret Army, Bergerac, Doctor Who's Time-Flight, Shackleton (playing photographer Frank Hurley), Special Squad, Bodyline (as cricketer Les Ames) and London's Burning.

In 1995, Dahlsen was awarded the David Karmel entrance award at Gray's Inn. Called to the bar the following year, he has since worked as a defence and prosecuting barrister.

Over time, his cases have involved drink-driving, assault, child abuse, kidnapping and sexual violence, brawling, murder, possession of weapons with intent, arson and threatening behaviour.

Dahlsen has occasionally taught law at the University of Law. In addition, he spent a month working in the Attorney-General's office of Saint Helena Supreme Court over 2017/2018.

References

External links 
 
 
 Barrister profile with list of cases
 Barrister Details - Mr Peter John Morgan Dahlsen

1951 births
Living people
Australian male television actors
People educated at Xavier College
Australian emigrants to the United Kingdom